Emiel van Dijk (born 22 March, 1985) is a Dutch politician and a member of the Party for Freedom. He represents the party on the Provincial Council of North Brabant and has served twice as a member of the  House of Representatives.

Van Dijk worked as a legislative assistant to PVV MEPS Lucas Hartong and Vicky Maeijer. In April 2018, he became a temporary member of the House of Representatives to cover for Gabrielle Popken who had gone on maternity leave and remained in the House to replace Karen Gerbrands who was on leave until 2021.

During a 2020 debate on immigration in the House of Representatives, Van Dijk used the word "omvolking" (or "demographic replacement") when referring to his opposition to European migration pact. The debate was temporarily closed after Christian Union MP Joël Voordewind accused Van Dijk of "using really a term from the Nazi era" to which Van Dijk described Voordewind's comment as "too much for words" and demanded that he withdraw the accusation.

References 

1985 births
21st-century Dutch politicians
Living people
Members of the House of Representatives (Netherlands)
Members of the Provincial Council of North Brabant
Party for Freedom politicians
People from The Hague